Frederick James "Fatty" Fudge is a fictional character who appears in the British comics magazine The Beano. He is the best friend of Minnie the Minx, and would eventually star in his own eponymous comic strip in 1989.

Character background
When he was known as Fatty Fudge, he had an addiction to unhealthy food, particularly confectionery. He was very greedy and would do anything for food, which Minnie often used to her advantage. Alongside Minnie's other rival Soppy Susan, he was usually the butt of Minnie's pranks, although his services were occasionally engaged by Minnie for the furtherance of her schemes.

Family 
He has a son named Frederick Fudge Jr. who goes to Posh Street School in Beanotown.

In other media 
Fatty appears in "Jelly Babies" in The Beano Videostars, voiced by Enn Reitel. His son, Francis, would appear as one of the Posh Street Kids in "Lake Beautiful" in The Beano Video, voiced by Jonathan Kydd.

Publication history

Fatty Fudge 
Minnie the Minx artist Jim Petrie helmed Fudge's eponymous comic strip, which began in issue 2425. Each story was a parody retelling of a popular movie which would feature Fudge as the protagonist and the food of choice, with a title to match. He also appeared in a parody of the British quiz show Bob's Full House, called "Slob's Full Tum" (now hosted by Slob Monkhouse), where contestants had to eat as much as they could and whoever got a full tum in the quickest time was the winner.

The strip reappeared in Issue 3616, dated 17 December 2011, it was so former artist Jim Petrie could get a proper retirement. The comic asked for ideas for the strip on Beano.com. In the end, the winning idea was "The Tummy Returns", suggested by William Clyde, this appeared in the comic. Other suggestions that were considered good by Petrie included: "Iron (stomach) Man" (Iron Man), "A-lard-in" (Aladdin), "Harry Scoffer and the order on Phoenix Street" (Harry Potter and the Order of the Phoenix), all from Harry Rickard, "Currynation Street" (Coronation Street) and "The Fat in the Hat" (The Cat in the Hat), both by Oliver Forde.

Subsequent appearances

The Beano 
Fudge's comic strip series has appeared in 1991 and 1992's Beano annuals, and in 1989 and 1995's Summer Specials.

Notes

References
Beano Comic Library No. 230: Fatty Fudge in 'Ghost-Burgers! Published by D. C. Thomson & Co. Ltd., 185 Fleet Street, London 1991.

External links 
https://web.archive.org/web/20091027022913/http://uk.geocities.com/pjgjimpertie/Fattyfudge.html

Beano strips
Humor comics
Gag-a-day comics
British comics characters
Child characters in comics
Male characters in comics
Comics spin-offs
Comics set in the United Kingdom